Atlanticville is an historic community in Charleston County, South Carolina. Its post office operated sporadically from 1903–24, 1925–37, and 1938–42.

Sources
 Journal of the American Philatelist, published monthly. State College, Pennsylvania. Use form US-T154/MMYYYY/p#. 072000/p648
 Atlanticville, South Carolina. Geographic Names Information System, U.S. Geological Survey.

Populated places in Charleston County, South Carolina